Robert Alexander James Henderson (born 27 October 1972 in Dover, England) is a retired Irish rugby union player who played for a number of clubs including Toulon and Munster. He represented Ireland internationally, winning 29 caps, and toured with the 2001 British & Irish Lions, winning three caps.

Educated at the Tiffin School, Kingston upon Thames, Henderson's natural athletic ability and aggression were effectively harnessed by rugby coach Dave Morris.

Henderson played for London Irish, Wasps, Leinster and joined Munster in late 2001. Whilst at Wasps he helped them win the Anglo-Welsh Cup in 1999 and 2000; he was a replacement in the 1999 final but started in 2000.

Henderson's career highlights at Munster include his tackle on Austin Healey in April 2003, which contributed to the try which was scored a mere two minutes later.  An injured Austin was unable to defend his line after being "Hendoed" and Ronan O'Gara got over the line.

Henderson joined the French side Toulon, then of Pro D2, in 2006 and played for three years there, including their promotion to the Top 14 in 2008, before returning to the UK to sign for Esher RFC.

Statistics

International analysis by opposition

Correct as of 7 July 2017

References

External links
Leinster Profile
Munster Profile
Ireland Profile
ESPNScrum Profile

1972 births
Living people
British & Irish Lions rugby union players from England
English people of Irish descent
English rugby union players
Ireland international rugby union players
Irish Exiles rugby union players
Leinster Rugby players
London Irish players
Munster Rugby players
People educated at Tiffin School
RC Toulonnais players
Rugby union players from Dover, Kent
Wasps RFC players
Young Munster players
Rugby union centres
Irish rugby union players
Irish expatriate rugby union players
English expatriate rugby union players
Irish expatriate sportspeople in France
English expatriate sportspeople in France
Expatriate rugby union players in France